Discoverer 37, also known as Corona 9030, was an American optical reconnaissance satellite which was lost in a launch failure in 1962. It was the last KH-3 Corona‴ satellite, which was based on an Agena-B rocket.

The launch of Discoverer 37 occurred at 21:41 UTC on 13 January 1962. A Thor DM-21 Agena-B rocket was used, flying from Launch Complex 75-3-4 at the Vandenberg Air Force Base; however, it failed to achieve orbit.

Discoverer 37 was intended to be operated in a low Earth orbit. Images were to have been recorded onto  film, and returned in a Satellite Recovery Vehicle at the end of the mission. The Satellite Recovery Vehicle which was to have been used by Discoverer 37 was SRV-571.

References

Spacecraft launched in 1962
Satellite launch failures